Azuki Island is a small island in Antarctica  west of Rundvågs Head in the southeast part of Lutzow-Holm Bay. It was mapped from surveys and from air photos by the Japanese Antarctic Research Expedition (JARE), 1957–1962, and named "Azuki-shima" ("azuki bean island").

See also 
 List of antarctic and sub-antarctic islands

References
 

Islands of Queen Maud Land
Prince Harald Coast